Fly By Night is a 1962 Australian TV play broadcast on the ABC and filmed in London. Written expressly for television, it starred Sophie Stewart who was also in The Little Woman.

Plot
In London near the Thames, Miss Tyrell, an elderly vagrant, meets a middle aged suburban housewife and her husband, Mr. and Mrs. Dexter, in a dockside cafe. Miss Tyrell prompts the Dexters to rebel against their life.

Cast
Dorothy Dunckley as Miss Tyrell
Sophie Stewart as Mrs Dexter, suburban housewife
Michael Duffield as her husband, Mr Dexter
John Ewart as taxi driver
Stewart Ginn
Peter Morris
Lou Vernon as Seamus
James Elliott as seaman
Olive Walker
Nat Levison

Production
The play had originally been filmed for British TV in 1961.

Reception
The Sydney Morning Herald wrote that "sensitive acting from a small but extremely competent cast triumphed... over rudimentary camera techniques to produce one of the most absorbing plays to appear on Channel 2 for a very long time.... Michael Dufficld's characterisation of the retired businessman, still haunted by youthful dreams of adventure, was a completely authentic... Dorothy Dunckley... gave an outstanding portrayal."

The Australian Women's Weekly called it "a most enjoyable TV surprise. The surprise was its standard - miles above the general standard of A.B.C. live plays in acting,production, and story. The story, described as a comedy with a difference,was not so darned comic. It was too real."

See also
List of television plays broadcast on Australian Broadcasting Corporation (1960s)

References

Australian television plays
1962 television plays
Television articles with incorrect naming style